The Pomaks in Turkey refers to an ethnic group, who are Sunni muslims, and speak their own dialect of Pomak language who is called Pomakça. They mostly live in Eastern Thrace, though some are also present in Anatolia.

Numbers 

In the census of 1965, those who spoke Pomak as first language were proportionally numerous in Edirne (3.4%), Kırklareli (1.3%) and Çanakkale (1.0%).

Language 

The Pomaks of Turkey speak a Bulgarian dialect. According to Ethnologue at present 300,000 Pomaks in European Turkey speak Bulgarian as mother tongue. It is very hard to estimate the number of Pomaks along with the Turkified Pomaks who live in Turkey, as they have blended into the Turkish society and have been often linguistically and culturally assimilated. According to Milliyet and Turkish Daily News reports, the number of the Pomaks along with the Turkified Pomaks in the country is about 600,000.

References 

Demographics of Turkey
Ethnic groups in Turkey
Ethnic groups in the Middle East